Madison Miller (1811–1896) was a US soldier, military officer and railroad manager.

In the Mexican–American War, Miller held a captaincy within the 2nd Illinois Regiment of Volunteers and was wounded at the Battle of Buena Vista.

By the Civil War, Miller had already held posts as the mayor Carondelet, Missouri, president of the St. Louis and Iron Mountain Railroad, and Missouri State Legislator. Mayor Miller was a passenger on the Pacific Railroad excursion train that crashed through the temporary bridge over the Gasconade River on November 1, 1855. He was badly injured in the accident. He then organized the 1st Missouri Light Artillery and was made commanding captain of the unit. Miller soon distinguished himself in the Union defeat at the Battle of Wilson's Creek.

In February, 1862, Miller was given the command of the 18th Missouri Volunteer Infantry following the removal of W. James Morgan as colonel. In the Battle of Shiloh, Miller commanded the 2nd Brigade in Benjamin Prentiss' division and took part in the fighting in the Hornet's Nest. Despite his courage in battle, he was taken prisoner when the men of the Hornet's Nest defense were captured. He was exchanged and returned to briefly command a brigade in the XVI Corps during the Winter of 1863–64. He resigned in March 1864 but was appointed Brigadier General in the Missouri State Militia in September 1864. He commanded a militia brigade during Price's Raid. On March 13, 1865 he was given a brevet promotion to brigadier general of U.S. volunteers for his service at Shiloh.

Following the war, he managed portions of the Pacific Railroad, dabbled in St. Louis, Missouri area real estate and held the position of vice-president within the Society of the Army of the Tennessee in 1893. He is buried at Bellefontaine Cemetery in St. Louis.

References

 Anders, Leslie, The Eighteenth Missouri, 1968

1811 births
1896 deaths
Military personnel from St. Louis
American military personnel of the Mexican–American War
Union Army colonels